Marcin Krzysztof Pochwała (born 14 February 1984) is a Polish slalom canoeist who has competed at the international level since 2001.

Career
He won three medals at the ICF Canoe Slalom World Championships with a gold (Mixed C2: 2018), a silver (Mixed C2: 2019) and a bronze (C2 team: 2003). He also won seven silvers and two bronzes at the European Championships.

Competing in four Summer Olympics in the C2 event, he earned his best finish of fifth in 2012 in London and again in 2016 in Rio de Janeiro (both with Piotr Szczepański). He was 8th in 2008 and 10th in 2004 (both with Paweł Sarna).

He has changed C2 partners several times during his career. He's had most success competing alongside Paweł Sarna (2001–2008) and Piotr Szczepański (since 2009). He was also partnered occasionally by Jarosław Miczek (2005) and Sławomir Mordarski (2006).

His partner in the mixed C2 boat is Aleksandra Stach.

Ski jumper Tomasz Pochwała is his cousin.

World Cup individual podiums

References

External links

1984 births
Canoeists at the 2004 Summer Olympics
Canoeists at the 2008 Summer Olympics
Canoeists at the 2012 Summer Olympics
Canoeists at the 2016 Summer Olympics
Living people
Olympic canoeists of Poland
Polish male canoeists
Sportspeople from Nowy Sącz
Medalists at the ICF Canoe Slalom World Championships